James Shuttleworth (1714 – 28 June 1773) was an English Member of Parliament and High Sheriff of Yorkshire.

He was born the eldest surviving son of Richard Shuttleworth (MP for Lancashire) of Gawthorpe Hall, Padiham, Lancashire and Forcett Hall, Yorkshire. He succeeded his father in 1769, inheriting both the Gawthorpe and Forcett estates and, like his father, chose to live at the latter.

He was elected MP for Preston in 1741, holding the seat until 1754. He was appointed High Sheriff of Yorkshire for 1760–61 and elected MP for Lancashire in 1761, sitting until 1768.

He died in 1773 and was buried at Forcett Church. He had married Mary, the daughter and heiress of Robert Holden of Aston Hall, Derbyshire, with whom he had four sons and three daughters. He was succeeded by his eldest son Robert, a Fellow of the Royal Society. A younger son, James, changed his surname to Holden under the terms of a legacy. A third, William, sailed with Captain James Cook on his third voyage in 1776.

References

 

1714 births
1773 deaths
People from Padiham
High Sheriffs of Yorkshire
Members of the Parliament of Great Britain for Lancashire
British MPs 1741–1747
British MPs 1747–1754
British MPs 1761–1768